Audie Murphy (1925–1971) was born into a poor family in Texas and became a highly decorated American soldier who served with the United States Army in nine campaigns in Europe  from 1942 to 1945. He was  the recipient of the Medal of Honor for his combat heroism in World War II and received every American combat award for valor available from the Army at the time of his service. At the onset of the Korean War, he was commissioned as an officer in the Texas National Guard and served with the Guard for sixteen years before retiring from military service. His home state posthumously awarded him the Texas Legislative Medal of Honor for his combined service in the Army and the Guard.

Murphy's two-decade acting career spanned radio, television, and over 40 films.  He was a collaborator on  several songs between 1962 and 1970.  His listening music of choice was country, and he had a natural talent for writing poetry. One of his better-known poems is "The Crosses Grow on Anzio" which appears in To Hell and Back attributed to a soldier named Kerrigan. Combined, his taste in music and  his poetic skill with rhyming and pentameter surfaced in the songs he wrote. All of his songs but the last one were written in partnership with Scott Turner.  As a musician in the pop and country music genres, Turner had become acquainted with Murphy through mutual friend Guy Mitchell. Their biggest hit was "Shutters and Boards", written at Murphy's ranch in 1962. The song is a man's lament over a failed relationship and the boarding up of the home they shared. The Billboard review of Jerry Wallace's recording of the tune noted, "War hero, movie star Audie Murphy is co-writer on this western-style weeper, which has a solid story lyric." In the early 1970s, Turner said that the song had been recorded by  approximately sixty vocalists in multiple languages.

"When the Wind Blows in Chicago" was another top hit written by Murphy and Turner in 1962.  Born out of a casual comment Murphy had made one evening when they were listening to the howling wind outside his California home, it was recorded by Dean Martin, Eddy Arnold, Porter Wagoner and other country music singers.

Twelve of their songs were written by just Murphy and Turner, although others also worked with them at times. Guy Mitchell joined them in writing two 1963 songs, "My Lonesome Room" recorded by Roy Clark and  "The Only Light I Ever Need is You"  for Jerry Wallace, and later Harry Nilsson. Murphy and Turner collaborated with Coy Ziegler on two songs for Jerry Wallace, "Big, Big Day Tomorrow" in 1964 and "Round and Round She Goes" in 1965.  Jimmy Bryant (as Ivy J. Bryant) worked with them as both songwriter and singer in 1966 on "Rattle Dance". "Was It All Worth Losing You" co-written with Terri Eddleman in 1970 was the last song Murphy wrote. Charley Pride recorded the song for his album The Incomparable Charley Pride.

Murphy's poem "Freedom Flies in Your Heart Like an Eagle" was contained within a speech he wrote for the 20 July 1968 dedication of the  Alabama War Memorial in Montgomery.  Turner set the poem to music, using its first three words as the song title "Dusty Old Helmet", but it was not recorded. The contractual relationship of Murphy and Turner split the royalties equally, and in their personal lives their respective families had close ties. One of the last known photographs of Murphy is with Turner at the Country Music Hall of Fame.

Songs
The following was compiled from Appendex Four in the book Audie Murphy, American Soldier by Harold B. Simpson, the U.S. Copyright Office, and other sources as noted.

Notes

Footnotes

Citations

References

External links

Murphy, Audie
Songs